The Daughter Pays is a 1920 American silent drama film directed by Robert Ellis and starring Elaine Hammerstein, Norman Trevor, and Robert Ellis.

Cast
 Elaine Hammerstein as Virginia Mynors
 Norman Trevor as Osbert Gault
 Robert Ellis as Gerald Roseborough
 Teresa Maxwell-Conover as Mrs. Mynors 
 Byron Russell as Percy Ferris 
 Dore Davidson as Mr. Roseborough
 Evelyn Times as Pansy Mynors

References

Bibliography
 Goble, Alan. The Complete Index to Literary Sources in Film. Walter de Gruyter, 1999.

External links
 

1920 films
1920 drama films
1920s English-language films
American silent feature films
Silent American drama films
American black-and-white films
Films directed by Robert Ellis
Selznick Pictures films
1920s American films